Younes Al-Mashmoum (born 17 October 1968) is a Kuwaiti fencer. He competed in the individual and team épée events at the 1988 Summer Olympics.

References

External links
 

1968 births
Living people
Kuwaiti male épée fencers
Olympic fencers of Kuwait
Fencers at the 1988 Summer Olympics